Dead Man is a 1995 American acid western film written and directed by Jim Jarmusch. It stars Johnny Depp, Gary Farmer, Billy Bob Thornton, Iggy Pop, Crispin Glover, John Hurt, Michael Wincott, Lance Henriksen, Gabriel Byrne, Mili Avital, and Robert Mitchum. The movie, set in the late 1800s, follows William Blake, a meek accountant on the run after murdering a man. He has a chance encounter with enigmatic Native American spirit-guide "Nobody", who believes Blake is the reincarnation of the visionary English poet William Blake.

The film is shot entirely in monochrome. Neil Young composed the guitar-dominated soundtrack with portions he improvised while watching the movie footage. Many have considered it a premier postmodern Western. It has been compared to Cormac McCarthy's novel Blood Meridian.

Plot
William Blake (Johnny Depp), an accountant from Cleveland, Ohio, rides by train to the frontier company town of Machine to take up a promised accounting job in the town's metal works. During the trip, the train fireman (Crispin Glover) warns Blake against the enterprise. Arriving in town, Blake notes the hostility of the townsfolk towards him. He then discovers that the position has already been filled, and John Dickinson (Robert Mitchum), the ferocious owner of the company, drives Blake from the workplace by gunpoint.

Jobless and without money or prospects, Blake meets Thel Russell (Mili Avital), a former prostitute who sells paper flowers. He lets her take him home. Thel's ex-boyfriend Charlie (Gabriel Byrne) surprises them in bed, shoots at Blake, and accidentally kills Thel when she shields Blake with her body. The bullet passes through Thel and wounds Blake, who kills Charlie with Thel's gun before climbing out the window and fleeing the town on Charlie's horse. Company owner Dickinson is Charlie's father and hires three killers — Cole Wilson, Conway Twill, and Johnny "The Kid" Pickett — to bring Blake back "dead or alive".

Blake awakens to find a large Native American man (Gary Farmer) trying to dislodge the bullet from his chest. The man, calling himself Nobody, reveals that the bullet is too close to Blake's heart to remove, rendering Blake effectively a walking dead man. When he learns Blake's full name, Nobody decides Blake is a reincarnation of William Blake, a poet whom he idolizes but of whom Blake is ignorant. He decides to care for Blake and to use Native methods to help ease him into death.

Blake learns of Nobody's past, marked by prejudice from both Native Americans and white people: Nobody's mother and father were from two opposing tribes, Piikáni (Blackfoot) and Apsáalooke (Crow), respectively. As a child, English soldiers abducted and brought him to Europe as a model savage. He was briefly educated before returning home, where his stories of the white man and his culture were laughed off by fellow Native Americans. They thus dub him Xebeche: "He who talks loud, saying nothing". Nobody resolves to escort Blake to the Pacific Ocean to return him to his proper place in the spirit-world.

Blake and Nobody travel west, leaving a trail of dead and encountering wanted posters announcing higher and higher bounties for Blake's death or capture. Nobody leaves Blake alone in the wild when he decides Blake must undergo a vision quest. On his quest, Blake kills two U.S. Marshals, experiences visions of nature spirits, and grieves over the remains of a dead fawn his pursuers accidentally kill. He paints his face with the fawn's blood and rejoins Nobody. Meanwhile, the most ferocious member of the bounty hunter posse, Cole Wilson, has killed his comrades (eating one of them) and continued his hunt alone.

At a trading post, a bigoted missionary (Alfred Molina) identifies Blake and attempts to kill him but instead dies at Blake's hands. Shortly after, Blake is shot again, and his condition rapidly deteriorates. Nobody hurries to take him by river to a Makah village and persuades the tribe to give him a canoe for Blake's ship burial. Delirious, Blake trudges through the village, where the people pity him, before he collapses from his injuries.

He awakens in a canoe on a beach wearing Native American funeral dress. Nobody bids Blake farewell and then pushes the canoe out to sea. As he floats away, Blake sees Cole approaching Nobody. Too weak to cry out, he can only watch as the two shoot and kill each other. Looking up at the sky one last time, Blake dies as his canoe drifts out to sea.

Cast
 Johnny Depp as William Blake, a meek accountant from Cleveland, Ohio
 Gary Farmer as Nobody, a strong and opinionated Native American forcibly raised by whites and later given the mocking name Xebeche, or "He Who Talks Loud, Saying Nothing", by fellow natives
 Crispin Glover as Train Fireman, a coal-covered boilerman who welcomes Blake to the "hell" of Machine
 Lance Henriksen as Cole Wilson, an infamous bounty hunter and murderous cannibal
 Michael Wincott as Conway Twill, a talkative bounty hunter
 Eugene Byrd as Johnny "The Kid" Pickett, a young bounty hunter
 John Hurt as John Scholfield, the business manager of Dickinson's factory
 Robert Mitchum as John Dickinson, a shotgun-toting industrialist in Machine (Mitchum's final film role before his death in 1997)
 Iggy Pop as Salvatore "Sally" Jenko, a cross-dressing, Bible-reading fur trader at a campsite
 Gabriel Byrne as Charlie Dickinson, Thel's ex-boyfriend and John Dickinson's son
 Jared Harris as Benmont Tench, a knife-toting fur trader at Sally's campsite
 Mili Avital as Thel Russell, a former prostitute who makes and sells paper flowers
 Billy Bob Thornton as Big George Drakoulias, a mountain man at Sally's campsite
 Michelle Thrush as Nobody's girlfriend
 Gibby Haynes as Man with gun in alley
 Alfred Molina as Trading Post Missionary, a corrupt missionary and businessman

Cultural allusions
The film contains many references to William Blake poetry. Xebeche aka Nobody recites from several Blake poems, including Auguries of Innocence, The Marriage of Heaven and Hell, and The Everlasting Gospel. When bounty hunter Cole warns his companions against drinking from standing water, it references the Proverb of Hell (from the aforementioned Marriage), "Expect poison from standing water". Thel's name is also a reference to Blake's The Book of Thel.

The scenes with Thel culminating in the bedroom murder scene visually enact Blake's poem, "The Sick Rose": "O rose, thou art sick. / The invisible worm, / That flies in the night / In the howling storm: / Has found out thy bed / Of crimson joy: / And his dark secret love / Does thy life destroy." The film's soundtrack album and promotional music video also features Depp reciting passages from Blake's poetry to music Neil Young composed for the film.

Although the film is set in the 19th century, Jarmusch included a number of references to 20th century American culture. Benmont Tench, the man at the campsite played by Jared Harris, is named after Benmont Tench, keyboardist for Tom Petty and the Heartbreakers. Billy Bob Thornton's character, Big George Drakoulias, is named for record producer George Drakoulias. The name of Mitchum's character is a reference to rock producer Jim Dickinson.

The marshals chasing Blake are named Lee Hazlewood and Marvin Throne-berry, after Lee Hazlewood and Marv Throneberry, and also an allusion to the American actor Lee Marvin. Nobody's name ("He Who Talks Loud, Saying Nothing") is a reference to the James Brown song "Talkin' Loud and Sayin' Nothing". Michael Wincott's character is shown in possession of a teddy bear. Also, when asked his name, Xebeche answers, "My name is Nobody." My Name Is Nobody was an Italian Western film from 1973 starring Henry Fonda and Terence Hill, and the clever answer of Ulysses to Polyphemus when asked the same question.

Portrayal of Native Americans
Dead Man is generally regarded as well-researched in regard to Native American culture. The film is also one of few about Native Americans to be directed by a non-native that offers a nuanced understanding of the individual differences between Native American tribes with considerable detail given that is relatively free of common stereotypes.

The film intentionally leaves conversations in the Cree and Blackfoot languages untranslated and without subtitles, for the exclusive understanding of members of those nations, including several in-jokes aimed at Native American viewers. Nobody was also played by a First Nations actor, Gary Farmer, who is Cayuga.

Reception

The film was entered into the 1995 Cannes Film Festival.

In its theatrical release, Dead Man earned $1,037,847 on a budget of $9 million. Then, it was the most expensive of Jarmusch's films, due in part to the costs of ensuring accurate period detail.

Critical responses were mixed. Roger Ebert gave the film one and a half (out of four) stars, noting "Jim Jarmusch is trying to get at something here, and I don't have a clue what it is". Desson Howe and Rita Kempley, both writing for The Washington Post, offered largely negative reviews. Greil Marcus, however, mounted a spirited defense of the film, titling his review "Dead Again: Here are 10 reasons why 'Dead Man' is the best movie of the end of the 20th century."

Film critic Jonathan Rosenbaum dubbed the film an acid western, calling it "as exciting and as important as any new American movie I've seen in the 90s" and went on to write a book on the film, Dead Man published by the British Film Institute. The film has a 70% approval rating on website Rotten Tomatoes based on 53 reviews, with an average rating of 7.1/10. The site's consensus reads: "While decidedly not for all tastes, Dead Man marks an alluring change of pace for writer-director Jim Jarmusch that demonstrates an assured command of challenging material". Metacritic reports a score of 62 out of 100 from 20 critics, indicating "Generally favorable reviews".

In July 2010, The New York Times chief film critic A. O. Scott capped a laudatory "Critics' Picks" video review of the film by calling it "One of the very best movies of the 1990s."

The Criterion Collection added the film to their collection, due to its "profound and unique revision of the western genre".

Soundtrack

Neil Young recorded the soundtrack by improvising (mostly on his electric guitar, with some acoustic guitar, piano and organ) as he watched the newly edited film alone in a recording studio. Jarmusch encouraged Young's improvisational music, as it would add to the film's spontaneous narrative. The soundtrack album consists of seven instrumental tracks by Young, with dialog excerpts from the film and Johnny Depp reading the poetry of William Blake interspersed between the music.

In other media
Gary Farmer makes a cameo appearance as Nobody in Jarmusch's subsequent film Ghost Dog: The Way of the Samurai, in which he repeats one of his signature lines of dialogue, "Stupid fucking white man!"

Johnny Depp makes a brief cameo as William Blake in Mika Kaurismäki's film L.A. Without a Map.

Rudy Wurlitzer's unproduced screenplay Zebulon inspired Jarmusch's film. Wurlitzer later rewrote the screenplay as the novel The Drop Edge of Yonder (2008).

See also
 List of post-1960s films in black-and-white
 Revisionist Western

References

External links
 
 
 
 
 
 
 
 Jonathan Rosenbaum interviews Jim Jarmusch about Dead Man
 Dead Man by Gino Moliterno
 Dead Man: Earth, Wind, and Fire an essay by Ben Ratliff at the Criterion Collection

1995 films
1995 Western (genre) films
American Western (genre) films
1990s English-language films
Films directed by Jim Jarmusch
Adaptations of works by William Blake
American black-and-white films
Blackfoot in popular culture
Cree-language films
Films about Native Americans
Films set in the 1870s
Films set in Washington (state)
Films shot in California
Films shot in New York (state)
Films shot in Nevada
Films shot in Oregon
American road movies
1990s road movies
European Film Awards winners (films)
1990s American films
Acid Westerns